Tsepo Lekhoana is a Mosotho footballer who currently plays as a striker for Likhopo Maseru. Since 2008, he has won five caps for the Lesotho national football team.

External links

Living people
Association football forwards
Lesotho footballers
Lesotho international footballers
Year of birth missing (living people)